Rachid Sabbagh (Arabic: رشيد الصباغ) is an independent Tunisian politician who joined the Ali Laarayedh cabinet in 2013 as defense minister.

References

Living people
Government ministers of Tunisia
Year of birth missing (living people)
Place of birth missing (living people)
Defence ministers of Tunisia
21st-century Tunisian politicians